Pialia or Pialeia (Πιάλεια) was a town of Histiaeotis in ancient Thessaly, at the foot of Mount Cercetium.

The location of Pialia is at a place called Skoumbos.

References

Populated places in ancient Thessaly
Former populated places in Greece
Histiaeotis